The 2019 Coastal Carolina Chanticleers men's soccer team represented Coastal Carolina University during the 2019 NCAA Division I men's soccer season and the 2019 Sun Belt Conference men's soccer season. The regular season began on August 30 and concluded on November 9. It was the program's 42nd season fielding a men's varsity soccer team, and their 4th season in the Sun Belt. The 2019 season was Shaun Docking's 22nd year as head coach for the program.

Roster

Schedule 

Source:

|-
!colspan=6 style=""| Non-conference regular season
|-

|-
!colspan=6 style=""| Sun Belt Conference regular season
|-

|-
!colspan=6 style=""| Sun Belt Conference Tournament
|-

|-
!colspan=6 style=""| NCAA Tournament
|-

|-

References 

2019
Coastal Carolina Chanticleers
Coastal Carolina Chanticleers
Coastal Carolina Chanticleers men's soccer
Coastal Carolina Chanticleers